Babuneh-ye Vosta (also Romanized as Bābūneh-ye Vosţá) is a village in Charuymaq-e Jonubesharqi Rural District, Shadian District, Charuymaq County, East Azerbaijan Province, Iran. A census in 2006 counted 78 people and 13 families.

References 

Populated places in Charuymaq County